Kipling Collegiate Institute (Kipling CI, KCI, or Kipling) is a public high school in  Toronto, Ontario, Canada. It is located in the former suburb of Etobicoke under the management of the Toronto District School Board, operating since 1960.

History
Kipling Collegiate was constructed in 1959 and opened its doors in September 1960. The school was built in a modernist design by architect Gordon Adamson.

The school merged with Scarlett Heights Entrepreneurial Academy in 2018 and attempts to rename the school failed.

See also
 List of high schools in Ontario

References

External links

 Kipling Collegiate Institute
 TDSB Profile

High schools in Toronto
Education in Etobicoke
Schools in the TDSB
Educational institutions established in 1960
1960 establishments in Ontario